Alex Esclamado (April 2, 1929 – November 11, 2012) was a Filipino-born American newspaper publisher, lawyer and journalist. In 1961, Esclamado founded the Philippine News out of his home in the Sunset District of San Francisco, California. Esclamado became a vocal opponent of former Philippines President Ferdinand Marcos after his government declared martial law in 1972.

Awards and recognition
In October 1986, Esclamado was recognized as the only Filipino-American recipient of the congressionally sponsored Ellis Island Medal of Honor award.

On May 9, 1989, President Cory Aquino conferred the Philippine Legion of Honor on Esclamado.

Later life and death
Esclamado returned to the Philippines in August 2011. On November 4, 2012, he died in his home town of Padre Burgos, Southern Leyte, from pneumonia, after a 10-year battle with Parkinson's disease. He was 83. He is survived by his wife, Lourdes, 7 children, 14 grandchildren, and 10 great-grandchildren.

Legacy
The National Federation of Filipino American Associations (NaFFAA) and GMA Network continue to acknowledge and give tribute to Esclamado's works and contributions to Filipino-American Community by giving the Alex Esclamado Memorial Award for Community Service to deserving Filipino people. The winners for the awards are screened by the Council for Filipino American Organizations of Central Florida, the West Bay Pilipino Multi-Service, Inc., Philippine American Chamber of Commerce of Texas, and the Pilipino American Unity for Progress, Inc.

References

1929 births
People from Southern Leyte
2012 deaths
American newspaper publishers (people)
Businesspeople from San Francisco
Lawyers from San Francisco
Filipino emigrants to the United States
20th-century American journalists
American male journalists
20th-century American businesspeople
20th-century American lawyers